Eviatar Nevo (born February 2, 1929, in Haifa, Mandatory Palestine), is Professor Emeritus, founder and director of the Institute of Evolution at University of Haifa, Israel.

Education
 
Nevo received a M.Sc and  PhD (1964) from Hebrew University. His Ph.D thesis was entitled "Population studies of Anurans from the lower Cretaceous of Makhtesh Ramon, Israel".  He founded the Institute of Evolution at Haifa in 1973. 
Nevo works with many evolutionary subjects, involving understanding and tracking of speciation processes, modifications of highly evolved traits (vision), climatic and geographic effects in sympatric speciation in insects, bacteria, fungi, mammals and crops. He is a proponent of evolutionary models where environmental stressors acting positively to shape genetic polymorphisms. The model of "Evolution Canyon" is a microscale open environment where two opposite slopes with contrasting climatic conditions have also finer biotic adaptations that have been researched at different biological scales, supporting the evolution in action generating evidence of sympatric speciation, and of particular impact and interest are the works in Drosophila and in wild barley.

He has published more than 1000 peer-reviewed research articles on a wide array of topics about genetic diversity, evolution in action, and environmental shaping of evolutionary processes. According to Thomson Reuters, he is among the top highly cited researchers in the world.

Awards and honors

He is a Foreign Member of the Linnean Society, London (1990) and of the Ukraine Academy of Sciences (1997). He is a Foreign Associate Member in Evolutionary Biology section of the National Academy of Sciences, USA (2000), an Honorary Member of the Ukraine Botanical Society (1995), of the American Society of Mammalogists (2002), and the Israel Zoological Society (2007). He received Honorary doctorates from World University (1990) and the University of Duisburg-Essen, Germany.

References 

1929 births
Living people
Israeli biologists
Foreign associates of the National Academy of Sciences
Academic staff of the University of Haifa
Evolutionary biologists
Hebrew University of Jerusalem alumni
Israeli people of Romanian-Jewish descent
People from Tel Aviv